Grace Abounding to the Chief of Sinners, or a Brief Relation of the Exceeding Mercy of God in Christ to his Poor Servant John Bunyan is a Puritan spiritual autobiography written by John Bunyan. It was composed while Bunyan was serving a twelve-year prison sentence in Bedford gaol for preaching without a license and was first published in 1666.

The title contains allusions to two Biblical passages: 'Grace Abounding' is a reference to the Epistle to the Romans 5:20, which states 'Where sin abounded, grace did much more abound' (KJV) and 'Chief of Sinners' refers to the First Epistle to Timothy 1:15, where Paul refers to himself by the same appellation.

External links
Full text on Project Gutenberg 
 

John Bunyan
1666 books
British autobiographies
Prison writings
Books by John Bunyan